Zawadka  (Zavadka) is a village in the administrative district of Gmina Ustrzyki Dolne, within Bieszczady County, Podkarpackie Voivodeship, in south-eastern Poland.

References

Zawadka